"I'll Never Dance Again" is a song released in 1962 by Bobby Rydell. The song spent 12 weeks on the Billboard Hot 100 chart, peaking at No. 14, while reaching No. 4 in India, No. 6 in Australia, and No. 29 on Canada's CHUM Hit Parade.

The song was recorded two years later by Freddie and the Dreamers on their 1964 album You Were Mad for Me, and by the Herman's Hermits on the UK version of their eponymous debut album, released in 1965.

Chart performance

References

1962 songs
1962 singles
Bobby Rydell songs
Cameo Records singles
Songs written by Barry Mann